HMS Ghurka was a Tribal-class destroyer built in 1907 for the Royal Navy. She served as part of the Dover Patrol during the First World War, playing a part in the sinking of the German submarine  in 1915, and was sunk by a German mine in 1917.

Construction and design
HMS Ghurka was ordered from Hawthorn Leslie as one of five Tribal-class destroyers purchased under the 1905–06 shipbuilding programme. The Tribals derived from a requirement by the First Sea Lord "Jackie" Fisher, for a steam turbine powered, oil-fueled destroyer capable of at least . Armament was specified as three 12 pounder (3 inch, 76 mm) 12 cwt guns and two 18 inch (450 mm) torpedo tubes. The ship was fitted with three low funnels. A high-pressure turbine drove the centre shaft, while the exhaust steam from this turbine fed two low-pressure turbines on the outer shafts. Separate cruising turbines were also fitted to the outer shafts. Two of the 12 pounder guns were mounted on the ship's forecastle, with the remaining gun situated aft.

Ghurka was laid down at Hawthorn Leslie's shipyard at Hebburn on the River Tyne on 6 February 1906 and launched on 29 April 1907. Prior to commissioning, Ghurkas armament was reinforced by adding another two 12 pounder guns.

Incidents while Under Construction

On 9 January 1908 steamer Hartley proceeding with a cargo of coal sheered and collided with Ghurka moored near the Hawthorn Leslie's shipyard in South Shields, and dealt extensive damage to the destroyers port quarter.

On 13 August 1908 steamer City of Naples while swinging preparing to proceed down river Tyne in South Shields collided with Ghurka moored near Hebburn Buoys, dealing considerable damage to the destroyer's starboard side.

Service
From 1910 to 1913, Ghurka served as part of the First Destroyer Flotilla, and then joined the Fourth Flotilla, based at Portsmouth. In October that year, the Tribals were officially designated the F class, and as such the letter "F" was painted on Ghurkas bows.

The short range of the Tribal class meant that they were unsuitable for long range operations, so, on the outbreak of the First World War, Ghurka, along with the rest of her class, joined the Sixth Destroyer Flotilla based at Dover as part of the Dover Patrol. Ghurka was damaged in a collision with her sister Tribal-class destroyer  on 23 August 1914, requiring repair in dry dock.

Viking detonated her explosive anti-submarine sweep without effect, but after the submarine was spotted by Maori, Ghurka used her own explosive sweep to force the German submarine to the surface. After briefly being shelled, the submarine was scuttled and abandoned, the crew surrendering. On 10 March 1915, Ghurka made another attack with an explosive sweep which at the time was believed to have probably sunk another submarine, but it was later discovered to be unsuccessful.

Another role of the Dover Patrol was shore bombardment, and Ghurka took part as an escort in the bombardment of Zeebrugge on 23 August 1915.

Ghurka was sunk on 8 February 1917 after hitting a German mine off Dungeness. Only five of the crew survived, with 74 killed. It is designated as a "protected place" under the Protection of Military Remains Act 1986.

Notes

Citations

Bibliography

External links
 SI 2008/0950 Designation under the Protection of Military Remains Act 1986
 HMS Gurkha, Index of 19th Century Naval Vessels

 

Tribal-class destroyers (1905)
Ships built on the River Tyne
1907 ships
World War I destroyers of the United Kingdom
World War I shipwrecks in the English Channel
Protected Wrecks of the United Kingdom
Wreck diving sites in the United Kingdom
Maritime incidents in 1917
Ships sunk by mines